Eugenio  Barrios García-Miguel (born 3 November 1976 in Quintanar de la Orden) is a retired Spanish middle distance runner specialising in the 800 metres. He competed at two outdoor and two indoor World Championships.

Competition record

Personal bests
Outdoor
800 metres – 1:44.84 (Rieti 2006)
1000 metres – 2:17.88 (Andújar 2006)
1500 metres – 3:36.81 (Berlin 2006)
Indoor
800 metres – 1:47.21 (Stockholm 2007)
1500 metres – 3:40.62 (Seville 2010)

References

RFEA profile

1976 births
Living people
Spanish male middle-distance runners
Sportspeople from the Province of Ciudad Real
Mediterranean Games gold medalists for Spain
Mediterranean Games silver medalists for Spain
Mediterranean Games medalists in athletics
Athletes (track and field) at the 2005 Mediterranean Games
Competitors at the 1999 Summer Universiade
Competitors at the 2003 Summer Universiade
21st-century Spanish people